In health physics, whole-body counting refers to the measurement of radioactivity within the human body.  The technique is primarily applicable to radioactive material that emits gamma rays. Alpha particle decays can also be detected indirectly by their coincident gamma radiation. In certain circumstances, beta emitters can be measured, but with degraded sensitivity. The instrument used is normally referred to as a whole body counter.

This must not be confused with a "whole body monitor" which used for personnel exit monitoring, which is the term used in radiation protection for checking for external contamination of a whole body of a person leaving a radioactive contamination controlled area.

Principles 

If a gamma ray is emitted from a radioactive element within the human body due to radioactive decay, and its energy is sufficient to escape then it can be detected. This would be by means of either a scintillation detector or a semiconductor detector placed in close proximity to the body. Radioactive decay may give rise to gamma radiation which cannot escape the body due to being absorbed or other interaction whereby it can lose energy; so account must be taken of this in any measurement analysis. Whole-body counting is suitable to detect radioactive elements that emit neutron radiation or high-energy beta radiation (by measuring secondary x-rays or gamma radiation) only in experimental applications.

There are many ways a person can be positioned for this measurement:  sitting, lying, standing.  The detectors can be single or multiple and can either be stationary or moving. The advantages of whole-body counting are that it measures body contents directly, does not rely on indirect bio-assay methods (such as urinalysis) as it can measure insoluble radionuclides in the lungs.

On the other hand, disadvantages of whole-body counting are that except in special circumstances it can only be used for gamma emitters due to self-shielding of the human body, and it can misinterpret external contamination as an internal contamination. To prevent this latter case scrupulous de-contamination of the individual must be performed first.
Whole body counting may be unable to distinguish between radioisotopes that have similar gamma energies. Alpha and beta radiation is largely shielded by the body and will not be detected externally, but the coincident gamma from alpha decay may be detected, as well as radiation from the parent or daughter nuclides.

Calibration 

Any radiation detector is a relative instrument, that is to say the measurement value can only be converted to an amount of material present by comparing the response signal (usually counts per minute, or per second) to the signal obtained from a standard whose quantity (activity) is well known.

A whole-body counter is calibrated with a device known as a "phantom" containing a known distribution and known activity of radioactive material. The accepted industry standard is the Bottle Manikin Absorber phantom (BOMAB).   The BOMAB phantom consists of 10 high-density polyethylene containers and is used to calibrate in vivo counting systems that are designed to measure the radionuclides that emit high energy photons (200 keV < E < 3 MeV).

Because many different types of phantoms had been used to calibrate in vivo counting systems, the importance of establishing standard specifications for phantoms was emphasized at the 1990 international meeting of in vivo counting professionals held at the National Institute of Standards and Technology (NIST). The consensus of the meeting attendees was that standard specifications were needed for the BOMAB phantom. The standard specifications for the BOMAB phantom provide the basis for a consistent phantom design for calibrating in vivo measurement systems. Such systems are designed to measure radionuclides that emit high-energy photons and that are assumed to be homogeneously distributed in the body.

Sensitivity 
A well designed counting system can detect levels of most gamma emitters (>200 keV) at levels far below that which would cause adverse health effects in people.  A typical detection limit for radioactive caesium (Cs-137) is about 40 Bq.  The Annual Limit on Intake (i.e., the amount that would give a person a dose equal to the worker limit that is 20 mSv) is about 2,000,000 Bq.  The amount of naturally occurring radioactive potassium present in all humans is also easily detectable. Risk of death by potassium deficiency approaches 100% as whole-body count approaches zero.

The reason that these instruments are so sensitive is that they are often housed in low background counting chambers.  Typically this is a small room with very thick walls made of low-background steel (~20 cm) and sometimes lined with a thin layer of lead (~1 cm).  This shielding can reduce background radiation inside the chamber by several orders of magnitude.

Count times and detection limit

Depending on the counting geometry of the system, count times can be from 1 minute to about 30 minutes.  The sensitivity of a counter does depend on counting time so the longer the count, for the same system, the better the detection limit. The detection limit, often referred to as the Minimum Detectable Activity (MDA), is given by the formula:

...where N is the number of counts of background in the region of interest; E is the counting efficiency; and T is the counting time.

This quantity is approximately twice the Decision Limit, another statistical quantity, that can be used to decide if there is any activity present. (i.e., a trigger point for more analysis).

History
In 1950, Leonidas D. Marinelli developed and applied a low-level gamma-ray Whole Body Counter to measure people who had been injected with radium in the early 1920s and 1930s, contaminated by exposure to atomic explosions, and by accidental exposures in industry and medicine  The sensitive methods of dosimetry and spectrometry Marinelli developed obtained the total content of natural Potassium in the human body.        Marinelli's Whole Body Counter was first used at Billings Hospital at the University of Chicago in 1952.

References

External links 

Radiation health effects
Ionising radiation detectors
Radiation protection